Víctor Guambe (born 8 October 1998) is a Mozambican footballer who plays as a goalkeeper for Costa do Sol and the Mozambique national football team.

Career

International
Guambe made his senior international debut on 28 June 2017 in a 2–1 victory over Seychelles at the 2017 COSAFA Cup.

Career statistics

International

References

External links

1998 births
Living people
CD Costa do Sol players
Moçambola players
Mozambican footballers
Mozambique international footballers
Association football goalkeepers
Sportspeople from Maputo
Mozambique A' international footballers
2022 African Nations Championship players